Edmund George "Eddie" Broad (3 January 1921 – c. 1993) was a rugby union player who represented Australia.

Broad, a fly-half, was born in Brisbane, Queensland and claimed 1 international rugby cap for Australia. He was selected in the 1947–48 Australia rugby union tour of the British Isles, Ireland, France and North America where he played in tour matches but no Tests.

References

Australian rugby union players
Australia international rugby union players
1921 births
1993 deaths
Rugby union players from Brisbane
Rugby union fly-halves